Last Embrace is an EP album by the group Northern Room, released on February 28, 2006. All vocals are sung by Andrew Jonathan.

Track listing

Standard version

Japanese version

Deluxe edition

The Deluxe Edition of Last Embrace is an LP album, released on November 2, 2008. It combines the tracks from the previous EPs, Last Embrace and Only Seconds. New material includes three live acoustic versions of previously released songs and a new song, "Home".

Track listing

External links
 Official Website
 Northern Room at MySpace
 Northern Room at Last.fm

Northern Room albums
2006 EPs